KCFL-LP (105.1 FM) was a radio station licensed to serve Aberdeen, Washington, United States. The station was last owned by Grays Harbor Educational Media.

The station was assigned the KCFL-LP call letters by the Federal Communications Commission on May 15, 2015.

The station's license was deleted on October 19, 2021.

See also
List of community radio stations in the United States

References

External links
 

CFL-LP
CFL-LP
Grays Harbor County, Washington
Defunct community radio stations in the United States
Radio stations established in 2003
Radio stations disestablished in 2021
Defunct radio stations in the United States
CFL-LP